In enzymology, a carnitine 3-dehydrogenase is an enzyme that catalyzes the chemical reaction

carnitine + NAD+  3-dehydrocarnitine + NADH + H+

Thus, the two substrates of this enzyme are carnitine and NAD+, whereas its 3 products are 3-dehydrocarnitine, NADH, and H+.

This enzyme belongs to the family of oxidoreductases, specifically those acting on the CH-OH group of donor with NAD+ or NADP+ as acceptor. The systematic name of this enzyme class is carnitine:NAD+ 3-oxidoreductase.

References

External links
 
 

EC 1.1.1
NADH-dependent enzymes
Enzymes of unknown structure